The 2004–05 season saw Sheffield Wednesday compete in Football League One where they finished in 5th position with 72 points. They went on to beat Hartlepool United in the 2005 Football League One play-off final.

Final league table

Results
Sheffield Wednesday's score comes first

Legend

Football League One

Football League One play-offs

FA Cup

Football League Cup

Football League Trophy

Squad statistics

References

External links
 Sheffield Wednesday 2004–05 at Soccerbase.com (select relevant season from dropdown list)

Sheffield Wednesday F.C. seasons
Sheffield Wednesday